Jessica Sage Yellin (born February 25, 1971) is an American journalist.  Focused primarily on politics, she was the Chief White House Correspondent for CNN in Washington, D.C. from 2011 to 2013. Described as "one of the most powerful women in Washington," Yellin began reporting for CNN as the network's senior political correspondent in 2007, covering Capitol Hill, domestic politics and the White House. Her debut novel, Savage News, was published in April 2019.

Early life and education
Yellin was born to a Jewish family in Los Angeles, California, the only daughter of Adele Marilyn (née Adest) and Ira Yellin. She has one brother, Seth. Her father, the son of an Orthodox rabbi, was a prominent real estate developer who focused on restoring older homes and neighborhoods in Los Angeles. He also was a past president of the American Jewish Committee. Jessica attended St. Augustine-by-the-Sea elementary school (now named Crossroads Elementary, of the Crossroads School for the Arts and Sciences) in Santa Monica, California. She was president of her high school graduating class at The Westlake School for Girls in Los Angeles and graduated from Harvard College magna cum laude where she was elected a member of Phi Beta Kappa.

Career
Yellin joined CNN as a Capitol Hill correspondent in August 2007. As Chief White House correspondent she conducted an in-depth interview with President Barack Obama that aired throughout the Democratic Convention and helped shape the network's coverage. She provided breaking news and analysis on President Obama's administration and during the 2012 election, interviewed Secretary of State Hillary Clinton, First Lady Michelle Obama, former White House Chief of Staff Rahm Emanuel, House Speaker John Boehner and former top economist Larry Summers. Prior to serving as Chief White House Correspondent, Yellin served as National Political Correspondent at CNN where she traveled the country covering hotly contested races throughout the network’s 2008 and 2012 ‘America Votes’ election coverage. Yellin has also covered significant policy debates in Washington, including the push to reform the financial regulatory system.

Prior to CNN, Yellin was a  White House correspondent for ABC News. She began with ABC in July 2003 and reported on politics and culture for such programs as Good Morning America and Nightline. She has interviewed Presidents Bill Clinton, George H. W. Bush and First Lady Laura Bush. She has also reported from around the globe, including Russia, China, Europe, Latin America and Mongolia.

She was previously an overnight anchor and correspondent for MSNBC. She covered the 2000 recount in Florida as a general assignment reporter at WTVT-TV in Tampa. She began her broadcast career in 1998 as a general assignment reporter for Orlando's 24-hour cable news channel, Central Florida News 13. In 1999, she was named morning anchor.

Yellin’s work has been published in The New York Times, The Los Angeles Times, Details magazine and Entertainment Weekly. Her experience includes working in Los Angeles reporting for George Magazine. Prior to this, she served as front-of-the-book editor at Los Angeles Magazine, where she contributed and edited stories on politics, Hollywood, and cultural issues.

In August 2013, Yellin became chief domestic affairs correspondent and also served as a substitute anchor.  Reportedly dissatisfied with the move, Yellin decided to leave CNN in October that same year.

In 2017,  on Instagram, Yellin launched News Not Noise.

Highlights and controversies

Bill Clinton, Sarah Palin and the economy
During her coverage of the 2008 presidential election, Yellin covered stories on Bill Clinton, Sarah Palin, and the U.S. economy.

Iraq War coverage
While appearing on Anderson Cooper 360° on May 28, 2008, Yellin admitted to having been pressured by her former employer, MSNBC, to avoid negative reporting and to report favorably on the war in Iraq in the run-up to it.
She later clarified her comments, and some speculate about pressure from her employers with regard to these matters.

Awards, recognition, and fellowships
In 2010, she won a Gracie Award for Outstanding Hard News Feature for Outstanding Women, a report on gender disparity in politics.  She won a Peabody Award for Best Political Team on Television while at CNN, and an Emmy Award for Outstanding Live Coverage of a Current News Story.

Yellin is a senior fellow at the USC Annenberg School of Journalism and a member of the Board of Directors for the Center for Public Integrity. She was a fellow at the University of Chicago Institute of Politics.

Bibliography
Savage News, Mira; April 2019;

References

External links
 News Not Noise 

1971 births
Television anchors from Orlando, Florida
Television anchors from Tampa, Florida
Living people
Harvard College alumni
People from Los Angeles
CNN people
American television reporters and correspondents
Jewish American journalists
American women television journalists
Crossroads School alumni
Journalists from California
Harvard-Westlake School alumni
21st-century American Jews
21st-century American women